Rutherglen Central and North is one of the 20 electoral wards of South Lanarkshire Council. Created in 2007, the ward elects three councillors using the single transferable vote electoral system and covers an area with a population of 14,237 people.

The ward was previously a Labour stronghold with the party holding two of the three seats from 2007 to 2017 however, the ward has since swung to the Scottish National Party (SNP) who won two of the three seats at the 2022 election.

Boundaries

The ward was created following the Fourth Statutory Reviews of Electoral Arrangements ahead of the 2007 Scottish local elections. As a result of the Local Governance (Scotland) Act 2004, local elections in Scotland would use the single transferable vote electoral system from 2007 onwards so Rutherglen Central and North was formed from an amalgamation of several previous first-past-the-post wards. It contained the vast majority of the former Bankhead ward, all of the former Burgh and Rutherglen West wards as well as a small part of the former Stonelaw ward. Rutherglen North covers a suburban area in the north of Rutherglen – the northernmost part of South Lanarkshire – including the neighbourhoods of Burgh, Bankhead, Burnhill, Gallowflat and Farme Cross as well as the unpopulated Shawfield industrial area. The ward's northern and western boundary is the long-established division with Glasgow City Council, part of which runs along the River Clyde.

Prior to the local government reforms in the 1990s, Rutherglen was within the Glasgow District under Strathclyde Regional Council. One of its single-member wards was Rutherglen, which included much of the same area as the current Rutherglen Central and North, with the exception of the Burnhill and Newfield neighbourhoods and the addition of the parts of Burnside north of the Cathcart Circle Line railway tracks.

Following the Fifth Statutory Reviews of Electoral Arrangements ahead of the 2017 Scottish local elections, streets around Overtoun Park, Dryburgh Avenue and Limeside Avenue were transferred into the ward from Rutherglen South.

Councillors

Election results

2022 election

2017 by-election

2017 election

2012 election

2007 election

Notes

References

Wards of South Lanarkshire
Rutherglen